Triple step is a generic term for dance step patterns that describes three steps done on two main beats of music. Usually they are two quick steps and one slow one, i.e., often they are counted as "quick-quick-slow", "one-and-two", "three-and-four", etc.

Some dances have a pattern known as such: "triple step". In some other dances it is referred to as the shuffle step.

Some triple steps are performed in a chassé-like manner: "side step, together, side step". The "cha-cha chassé" is an example of this kind of a triple step. In some other cases the steps may be done in place.

Some dances such as swing dances have several variants of triple step.

The 3rd part i.e., cued as step usually uses half the time of the whole pattern, e.g. one quarter note
The tri-ple part may be danced evenly, e.g., two eighth notes or unevenly (on swung notes), e.g., the first part taking up 2/3s of a beat and the second part 1/3, or the first part taking up 3/4 of the beat and the 2nd part 1/4. The pattern may also be syncopated so that the first step is shorter than the second giving a feeling of Tri-ple-step, instead of Tri-ple-step.

See also
 Two-step (dance move)

Social dance steps